Chequer's Wood and Old Park is a  biological and geological Site of Special Scientific Interest on the eastern outskirts of Canterbury in Kent. It is a Geological Conservation Review site.

This site includes Fordwich Pit, which has yielded a large collection of early Acheulian handaxes dated to 620,000 to 560,000 years old. Making them the oldest reliably dated handaxes in Britain, and the site one of the oldest archaeological sites in northern Europe. The site is also notable for the discovery of other stone tool types, including scrapers, awls, flakes and cores. The tools were potentially made by Homo heidelbergensis, and the site represents the only securely dated evidence of hominins in Britain during this period (marine isotope stage 15). 

Habitats include alder wood in a valley bottom, acidic grassland on dry sandy soil, oak and birch woodland, scrub and a pond.

Access
The site is owned by Canterbury City Council and the Ministry of Defence, and includes a pond (Reed Pond) which is managed by a local environmental organisation. There is a footpath and cycle path through it. The majority of the site, formerly used by the military for training, has no public access.

References

Sites of Special Scientific Interest in Kent
Geological Conservation Review sites